In England, a Connexions Centre was a location, as part of the government-funded Connexions service, where young people aged thirteen to nineteen in England could go for confidential support and advice on a number of topics. The staff were known as Connexions Personal Advisers and were "trained to offer confidential advice and practical help".

The service offered advice on:
Careers
Education
Work
Relationships
Sex & Sexual health
Pregnancy
Abortion
Homelessness
 General Advice
Health
Finance
And many other social issues that affect teens.

Education in the United Kingdom